Semenoviella haasi is a species of beetles in the family Buprestidae, the only species in the genus Semenoviella.

References

Monotypic Buprestidae genera